MOME or Mome may refer to:

 Mome (comics), a U.S. comics anthology trademarked MOME
 Møme (born 1989), French DJ
 Management of Major Emergency, a qualified course for the OIM
 Archaically, an idiot
 In Discordianism, a Mome is a female version of a Pope
 "La Môme Piaf", nickname for French singer Édith Piaf
 La Môme, the French title for the film La Vie en rose, based on Piaf's life
 YM Museum of Marine Exploration Kaohsiung, a museum in Kaohsiung, Taiwan
 Moholy-Nagy University of Art and Design, a university in Budapest, Hungary (Moholy-Nagy Művészeti Egyetem)